Zanjani is a surname. Notable people with the surname include:

Abbas-Ali Amid Zanjani (1937–2001), Iranian politician
Asadollah Bayat-Zanjani (born 1941), Iranian theologian
Babak Zanjani (born 1974), Iranian business magnate
Abdulkarim Zanjani (1887–1968), Muslim scholar
Esmail Zanjani, American researcher
Mirza Abutaleb Zanjani (1843–1911), Iranian jurist
Mohammad Ezodin Hosseini Zanjani (1921–2013), Iranian Twelver Shi'a Marja'
Seyyed Mohammad Hosseini Zanjani (born 1947), Iranian Twelver Shi'a Marja'  
Mousa Shubairi Zanjani (born 1928), Iranian Twelver Shi'a Marja'
Nina Zanjani (born 1981), Swedish actress
Reza Zanjani (1902–1984), Iranian cleric

Surnames of Iranian origin
Toponymic surnames